George Haliburton (1616–1665) was a 17th-century Scottish minister who served as Bishop of Dunkeld.

Life

The son of Janet Ogilvie, and her husband, George Haliburton, George was born in Glenisla, Angus, where his father was a minister.

In 1636, he graduated MA from King's College, Aberdeen, thereafter receiving his licence for the ministry from Meigle presbytery. He served as an army chaplain in 1640 and 1641, before being appointed minister of Menmuir in November 1642.

From 1 August 1644, he was "second charge" minister of Perth. He was briefly deposed (1644–1645) for saying a blessing while dining with the Marquess of Montrose. In July 1649 he was placed in "first charge" of Perth.

After the reinstatement of episcopacy in 1662, James Sharp, Archbishop of St Andrews recommended him for the bishopric of Dunkeld. He was consecrated Bishop of Dunkeld, on 7 May 1662, at Holyrood Palace, retaining his parochial position in Perth.

He died in Perth on 5 April 1665 and was buried in the Greyfriars Burial Ground.

Family

In 1643 he married Catherine Lindsay (d.1669), the daughter of the late David Lindsay, Bishop of Edinburgh. Their five children included James Haliburton of Wattriebutts (d.1699).

References

 Clarke, Tristram, "Haliburton, George (c.1616–1665)", in the Oxford Dictionary of National Biography, Oxford University Press, 2004 , retrieved 20 Feb 2007

1616 births
1665 deaths
Alumni of the University of Aberdeen
Bishops of Dunkeld (Church of Scotland)
People from Angus, Scotland
Scottish military chaplains
Scottish Restoration bishops
Members of the Parliament of Scotland 1661–1663